KATC (channel 3) is a television station in Lafayette, Louisiana, United States, affiliated with ABC and The CW Plus. Owned by the E. W. Scripps Company, the station has studios on Eraste Landry Road in Lafayette, and its transmitter is located near Branch, Louisiana.

History
The station began operations on September 19, 1962, and was locally owned by Acadian Television Company. Conventional wisdom suggested it should have signed on as an NBC affiliate, but instead it took the ABC affiliation full-time. Previously, ABC had been limited to off-hours clearances on CBS affiliate KLFY-TV (channel 10). This was a very unusual move for a then two-station market, especially one of Lafayette's size. Usually, ABC, as the smallest and weakest network, was relegated to secondary status on one or both of the existing stations. However, most of the region could view the full NBC schedule on Lake Charles' KPLC-TV and Baton Rouge's WBRZ-TV (the latter now a fellow ABC affiliate), both of which provided at least grade B coverage to much of the market. In contrast, no ABC affiliate even put a grade B signal into the area. Acadian Television apparently figured that if it linked up with ABC, it would not get much local competition.

KATC coined the term "Acadiana" in the early 1960s and popularized it throughout south Louisiana. In early 1963, the ABC affiliate received an invoice erroneously addressed to the Acadiana Television Corp.; someone had typed an extra "a" at the end of the word "Acadian." The station started using it to describe the region covered by its broadcast signal.

Acadian Television sold the station to Loyola University New Orleans in 1982, making it a sister station to New Orleans' CBS affiliate, WWL-TV. In the late 1980s, Loyola divested their broadcast properties, with WWL-TV going to a group of station employees (Rampart Operating Partnership) in 1990 and KATC going to investment firm Merrill Lynch in 1986. In 1993, the station joined other ABC affiliates, including WBRZ in not airing the pilot to NYPD Blue. In 1995, The Evening Post Publishing Company purchased the station through its subsidiary Cordillera Communications. In 2003, the station started broadcasting in stereo.

KATC continued to use its transmitter for its analog signal located south of Crowley, Louisiana until the mandated digital date of June 12, 2009. KATC is also an alternate ABC affiliate for Lake Charles and Southwest Louisiana. That area did not have an ABC affiliate of its own until August 31, 2017, when Fox affiliate KVHP launched an ABC-affiliated subchannel on DT2. KATC, due to its strong signal can also be seen in most of the Baton Rouge region.

Cordillera announced on October 29, 2018 it would sell most of its stations, including KATC, to the E. W. Scripps Company. The sale was completed on May 1, 2019. Upon completion of the sale, KATC became Scripps' first station in the state of Louisiana.

Newscasts

The station produces local news and talk programming, with such shows as Good Morning Acadiana, Friday Night Football and "hard-news" newscasts that air weekdays at 5, 6, and 10 p.m., Saturdays at 6 and 10 p.m., and on Sundays at 5:30 and 10 p.m. On April 16, 2012, KATC began broadcasting its local newscasts in high definition. The station also debuted a brand new logo, graphics package and new set and redesigned newsroom.

Historically, KATC was a very distant runner-up to KLFY. Although its various owners have always poured significant resources into its news department, KATC was hamstrung by KLFY's seven-year head start. In the 2000s, KATC began to achieve traction in the ratings against KLFY by recruiting talent from KLFY's news staff. In turn, KLFY was undergoing numerous ownership and programming changes, largely jettisoning the Eyewitness News format it had used during much of its history.

Technical information

Subchannels
The station's digital signal is multiplexed:

Prior to June 14, 2010, KLWB (channel 50) was Lafayette's CW affiliate. It had since moved to KATC 3.2. Grit was added by former owner Cordillera on June 28, 2016. Court TV and Bounce were added after Scripps purchased KATC. Court TV on its initial launch May 8, 2019 and Bounce March 5, 2021 (which gives every TV market in Louisiana the network).

Analog-to-digital conversion
KATC shut down its analog signal, over VHF channel 3, on June 12, 2009, the official date in which full-power television stations in the United States transitioned from analog to digital broadcasts under federal mandate. The station's digital signal remained on its pre-transition UHF channel 28. Through the use of PSIP, digital television receivers display the station's virtual channel as its former VHF analog channel 3.

References

External links

ABC network affiliates
Grit (TV network) affiliates
Court TV affiliates
Bounce TV affiliates
Television channels and stations established in 1962
ATC (TV)
Acadia Parish, Louisiana
1962 establishments in Louisiana
E. W. Scripps Company television stations